Howard C. Anderson Jr. is an American politician. He is a former member of the North Dakota State Senate from the 8th District. He is a member of the Republican party.

References

Living people
Republican Party North Dakota state senators
21st-century American politicians
Year of birth missing (living people)